Senator McCoy may refer to:

Beau McCoy (born 1980), Nebraska State Senate
John McCoy (American politician) (born 1943), Washington State Senate
Matt McCoy (politician) (born 1966), Iowa State Senate
Scott McCoy (born 1970), Utah State Senate
William McCoy (Oregon politician) (1921–1996), Oregon State Senate